Arius festinus is a species of fish in the family Ariidae. It is endemic to Madagascar.  Its natural habitat is rivers. It is threatened by habitat loss.

References

festinus
Freshwater fish of Madagascar
Taxonomy articles created by Polbot
Fish described in 2003